In Japanese video gaming, a , , is an unenjoyable or poorly made video game. Though the label is usually applied disparagingly, there is a subculture of celebrating kusoge.

Etymology 

Though it is commonly attributed to illustrator , and occasionally to Takahashi-Meijin of Hudson Soft, it is unclear when and by whom it was popularized – or whether a single source can be attributed in the first place. By the language used in video magazines of the time, it appears that the word was nascent in 1986 and a common expression by 1987.

Culture 

"Kusoge" is in essence a disparaging term, and is typically used to recommend against a video game. Nonetheless, a subculture that celebrates kusoge and seeks them out has established itself. This is similar to paracinema or camp appreciation of works of art: often but not always ironic; reveling in what is incoherent, odd, absurd, flawed, or broken.

In later years, the word "kusoge" has occasionally been embraced by video game companies. Sunsoft similarly used the word in the marketing for the 2023 video game Ikki Unite – a sequel to noted kusoge Ikki – stating in a press release that .

Notes

References 

Concepts in aesthetics
Cultural trends
Japanese words and phrases
Video game types